Gerrards Cross railway station is a railway station in the town of Gerrards Cross in Buckinghamshire, England.

History
The station was built as part of the Great Western and Great Central Joint Railway and was opened on 2 April 1906 as Gerrards Cross for the Chalfonts. It is in a deep cutting that was dug for the line to maintain a very shallow maximum gradient, to allow for fast running with steam-hauled trains. The line opened after the Chalfont Viaduct was built  further up the line to traverse the River Misbourne.

The original station layout was four-track, with two through roads and two platform roads. The two through roads were disused from 1985 and were completely removed by October 1989. This enabled the Up platform to be extended out and built over what used to be the Up through and platform roads, with the original Up line slewed to the Down through road. There was a small goods yard north of the line. This has now been removed, but services from Marylebone that terminate at Gerrards Cross use the siding there. There were two signal boxes at Gerrards Cross station, one on the east side of the station and one on the west side. The east signal box was closed in 1923. The west signal box was renamed 'Gerrards Cross' and was located on the Down line and remained in use until 11 August 1990 when a total route modernisation was carried out by British Rail and signalling was passed to the new Marylebone Integrated Control Centre.

The new line and station effectively created the present Gerrards Cross; the original settlement lay for the most part along the Oxford Road.

The station was transferred from the Western Region of British Railways to the London Midland Region on 24 March 1974.

The bronze 'Railway Navvy' sculpture behind the Up platform was created by Anthony Stones who was commissioned in 1992 by the Colne Valley Park Groundwork Trust. The band Genesis contributed £3,000 towards the cost of the sculpture in appreciation of their song 'Driving the Last Spike' on their album We Can't Dance.

In October 2007 work began on installing ticket barriers; these became operational on Monday 10 March 2008.

Between March and June 2021, the station was refurbished. The work included replacing the canopies, installing lighting across the entire station, repairs to the roof and windows, and a repaint.

Tunnel works

A development by the Tesco supermarket chain turned the cutting on the London side of the station into a tunnel by the use of large concrete ring segments to form the tunnel profile. The space on top of these segments was filled in to form a ground surface on which the new supermarket was built.

Service interruption
At 19:35 on 30 June 2005,  of tunnel roof near its eastern end collapsed, depositing broken tunnel segment fragments and many tonnes of infill material on the track. News pictures showed that the concrete segments adjoining the hole, which were still in place, appeared to have bowed downwards where two segments met.

A Marylebone-bound train was standing at the "up" platform when the tunnel collapsed. Its driver saw the collapse and raised the alarm, so all rail traffic was stopped. No one was injured. A "down" train that had left  had to make an emergency stop between stations and go back to Denham Golf Club to allow its passengers to alight. Again, no one was injured.

Service restoration and line centenary
Following work on removing infill material and various concrete segments, both those that actually failed and those that were judged unsafe but had not actually collapsed, the trackwork and signalling system were restored. Train services resumed from start of the normal timetable on Saturday 20 August 2005.

Gerrards Cross railway station had its centenary in 2006. This was celebrated with two London, Midland and Scottish Railway steam locomotives, Class 8F 48151 and Jubilee Class 5690 Leander, hauling trains between Marylebone and High Wycombe.

Service
The Monday - Friday off-peak service consists of:

4 trains per hour to 
1 train per hour to 
1 train per hour to 
1 train per hour to 
1 train per hour terminates

The station consists of two platforms, with a turn back siding just west of the station to allow trains to terminate/start at Gerrards Cross.

An equivalent service departed from Paddington, and ran non-stop to Gerrards Cross. These trains traversed the now closed former main line between Northolt Junction and Old Oak Common Junction, in many places reduced to a single track. This section was used more frequently by freight and waste trains, and also diversions during engineering works. The service was later truncated to commence at South Ruislip, returning to High Wycombe without stopping at Gerrards Cross. In December 2018 was rerouted to West Ealing via the Greenford line.

References

External links

 Information and news on the Gerrards Cross Tunnel

Former Great Western and Great Central Joint Railway stations
Railway stations in Buckinghamshire
Railway stations in Great Britain opened in 1906
Railway stations served by Chiltern Railways
Gerrards Cross